Daisy Newman (1904–1994) was a writer born in Britain to American parents.

Biography
Newman was educated at Radcliffe College, Barnard College, and Oxford University. She wrote novels and non-fiction about Quakers (the Society of Friends) in America. She married George Selleck late in life. Both were elders at Friends Meeting in Cambridge, Massachusetts.

Newman's novels include: Now That April's There (1945), Diligence in Love (1951), The Autumn's Brightness (1955), I Take Thee, Serenity (1975), Indian Summer of the Heart (1982), and A Golden String (1986).  She wrote a history of American Quakers entitled A Procession of Friends. Published in 1972, it is about the active position of Friends in opposing slavery, in relations with the native peoples of North America, in opposing war and capital punishment, and in supporting the humane treatment of the mentally ill and prisoners.

See also
 Testimony of equality

External links
Daisy Newman reflects on the novel as a medium for exploring the human condition interviewed on public radio by David Freudberg

1904 births
1994 deaths
Radcliffe College alumni
Barnard College alumni
American Quakers
20th-century American novelists
American women novelists
20th-century American women writers
American women non-fiction writers
20th-century American non-fiction writers
20th-century Quakers